The 1971 Florida State Seminoles football team represented Florida State University in the 1971 NCAA University Division football season. Larry Jones was head coach, Steve Sloan was an assistant coach/offensive coordinator, and Bill Parcells coached the linebackers.

Schedule

Roster

Season summary

at Florida

References

Florida State
Florida State Seminoles football seasons
Florida State Seminoles football